Jean-Gilles Delcour (1632–1695), is a walloon painter of religious subjects, was born at Hamoir, near Liège. He was a scholar of Geraert Douffet, but went to Rome and there studied for a long time under Andrea Sacchi and Carlo Maratti. He made excellent copies of some of Raphael's most celebrated works, which still exist at Liège, where there are also some original pictures by him in the churches. He died at Liège in 1695.

References
 

1632 births
1695 deaths
17th-century Flemish painters
People from Liège Province
Pupils of Carlo Maratta